Thomas Raymond Johnson (born April 2, 1951) is a former Major League Baseball pitcher. He played five seasons in the majors, from  until  for the Minnesota Twins. He pitched in 129 games during his career, all but one as a reliever.

Johnson was signed as an undrafted free agent in 1970. After four years in the Twins' minor league system, he made his major league debut on September 10, 1974.

After the  season, Johnson was released, and signed a year later by the Chicago White Sox. He became a starter for the White Sox triple-A affiliate in Glens Falls, but was largely unsuccessful. After the 1980 season, Johnson retired at the age of twenty-nine.

References

External links
, Retrosheet, or Baseball Almanac, or SABR Biography Project

Living people
1951 births
Auburn Twins players
Baseball players from Minnesota
Gulf Coast Twins players
Major League Baseball pitchers
Minnesota Twins players
Orlando Twins players
Tacoma Twins players
Tigres de Aragua players
American expatriate baseball players in Venezuela
Wilson Pennants players
Wisconsin Rapids Twins players
Minnesota Golden Gophers baseball players
Glens Falls White Sox players